Johann Jakob Hohl (7 June 1834 – 6 March 1913) was a Swiss politician and President of the Swiss Council of States (1896).

External links 
 
 
 

1834 births
1913 deaths
Members of the Council of States (Switzerland)
Presidents of the Council of States (Switzerland)